Japanese in Thailand may refer to:
Japanese invasion of Thailand during World War II
Japanese military alliance with Thailand during World War II
Japanese migration to Thailand, ranging from the 17th century to the present
Japanese language education in Thailand